
Year 326 (CCCXXVI) was a common year starting on Saturday (link will display the full calendar) of the Julian calendar. At the time, it was known as the Year of the Consulship of Constantinus and Constantinus (or, less frequently, year 1079 Ab urbe condita). The denomination 326 for this year has been used since the early medieval period, when the Anno Domini calendar era became the prevalent method in Europe for naming years.

Events 
 By place 
 Roman Empire 
 Emperor Constantine the Great travels to Rome to celebrate the 20th anniversary of his accession to power, but while en route at Pola he orders his older son, Crispus Caesar, to be executed, possibly on charges of adultery. Later, Fausta, second wife of Constantine I, is also executed by being suffocated in a hot bath.
 Constantine I founds Constantinople and incorporates Byzantium into the new capital. He reorganises the Roman army in smaller units classified into three grades: palatini, (imperial escort armies); comitatenses, (forces based in frontier provinces) and limitanei (auxilia border troops).
 Constantine I promulgates laws against the prostitution of maidservants, and for the humanization of prisons.

 By topic 
 Art 
 Constantine the Great, from the Basilica of Maxentius and Constantine in Rome, is finished. It is now kept at Palazzo dei Conservatori, Rome.

 Religion 
 September 14 (traditional date) – Helena, mother of Constantine I, discovers the so-called True Cross and the Holy Sepulchre (Jesus's tomb) in Jerusalem. On her pilgrimage, she pauses on the Aegean island of Patmos, where she is said to found the church of Panagia Ekatontapiliani.
 Helena tells Constantine that he must atone for executing his son and wife by building churches, and at about this date construction begins on Old St. Peter's Basilica, the first church on the traditional site of Saint Peter's tomb in Rome, and on the basilica of Golgotha on Calvary outside Jerusalem.
 Christianity is introduced to the Kingdom of Iberia (modern-day Georgia) by Saint Nino (approximate date).

Births 
 Constantius Gallus, Roman consul and statesman  (d. 354)
 Murong Chui (or Daoming), Chinese general (d. 396)

Deaths 
 Flavius Julius Crispus, son of Constantine I (b. 303)
 Flavia Maxima Fausta, Roman empress (b. 289)
 Licinius II, Roman consul and caesar (b. 315)
 Liu (or Xianlie), Chinese empress of Han Zhao